Evert Johan Valdemar Huttunen (8 May 1884, Toksovo, Saint Petersburg Governorate - 29 March 1924) was a Finnish journalist and politician. He was a member of the Parliament of Finland from 1916 until his death in 1924, representing the Social Democratic Party of Finland (SDP). He did not take part in the Finnish Civil War, maintaining a neutral attitude.

References

External links
 

1884 births
1924 deaths
People from Vsevolozhsky District
People from Shlisselburgsky Uyezd
Social Democratic Party of Finland politicians
Members of the Parliament of Finland (1916–17)
Members of the Parliament of Finland (1917–19)
Members of the Parliament of Finland (1919–22)
Members of the Parliament of Finland (1922–24)
20th-century Finnish journalists